Herbert Salcher (3 November 1929 – 9 November 2021) was an Austrian politician. A member of the Social Democratic Party of Austria, he served as Minister of Social Affairs from 1970 to 1976, Federal Minister for Health and Environmental Protection from 1979 to 1981, and Minister of Finance. He also briefly served in the National Council in 1983.

References

1929 births
2021 deaths
20th-century Austrian politicians
Finance Ministers of Austria
Social Democratic Party of Austria politicians
Members of the Austrian Parliament
Politicians from Innsbruck